Eagle Force is a line of die-cast action figures.

Eagle Force can also refer to:

 The Malaita Eagle Force, militant Solomon Islands organization
 The Eagle's Force, song by William Byrd
 Eagle Force, painting commemorating the RAF's and RCAF's Eagle Squadrons